is a 1956 black-and-white Japanese film directed by Katsuhiko Tasaka.

Cast
 Ichikawa Raizō VIII
 Shintaro Katsu

References

Kadokawa Dwango franchises
Japanese black-and-white films
1956 films
Films directed by Katsuhiko Tasaka
Daiei Film films
1950s Japanese films